The 1895 African Exhibition at The Crystal Palace was an instance of a human zoo in London. The colonial exhibition presented around eighty people brought from Somalia along with two-hundred African animals.

History 
The exhibition was organised by Carl Hagenbeck and Josef Menges as an effort to rehabilitate the Crystal Palace which was becoming less popular among visitors.

Display 
The Somalis were brought from Berbera, Somaliland. The "exhibits" at the human zoo spent their time in a kraal but slept in covered buildings due to the cold weather. They were wearing exotic animal skins and had red mud in their hair. During the exhibition, they had to perform national sports and dances multiple times a day, set up and take down of their accommodation and cook food. The people also had to mimic "warfare" where different tribes attack each other until Europeans arrive to end the conflict.

The display included large paintings and set pieces representing Somalia. These served as a backdrop when all the people and the animals formed a "caravan" and passed through the space.

References

External links 

 1895 African Exhibition at the Crystal Palace on the website Human Zoos

Crystal Palace, London
Colonial exhibitions